A by-election was held for the South Australian House of Assembly seat of Frome on 17 January 2009. This was triggered by the resignation of former Premier and state Liberal MHA Rob Kerin. The seat had been retained by the Liberals at the 2006 state election on a 3.4 per cent margin, and at the 2002 state election on an 11.5 per cent margin.

The writ for the by-election was issued on 28 November, with the rolls closing on 8 December. Candidate nominations closed 18 December at midday.

Independent candidate Geoff Brock ended up winning the seat from the Liberals in a very close contest.

Background
Kerin was first elected as the member for the new rural Port Pirie-based seat of Frome at the 1993 state election where the Liberals won government. From 1995 he held various ministries in the Brown and Olsen Liberal governments until he became Premier of South Australia in October 2001, before losing government to the Mike Rann-led Labor Party at the March 2002 state election. Kerin remained Liberal leader until after the 2006 state election when he resigned the leadership to make way for Iain Evans.

The state by-election was the first to be held since the 1994 Taylor by-election, when another former Premier, Lynn Arnold, retired from politics.

Candidates

The Family First Party and the Australian Democrats, who ran candidates in the previous election, polling 5.2 percent and 2 percent respectively, did not nominate a candidate to contest the by-election.

Issues
Of concern to the electorate was the potential closure of the Nyrstar smelter in Port Pirie due to the federal government's emissions trading scheme known as the Carbon Pollution Reduction Scheme, however it won special exemption from the scheme on 17 December.

Port Pirie Mayor and Independent candidate Geoff Brock was considered a possibility for winning the seat, with a strong local profile, and receiving preference recommendations in how-to-vote cards (HTVs) from Labor and the Nationals, whilst the Greens did not recommend preferences. Brock's own HTV recommended preferences to the Nationals, Labor, Liberal, Green, and One Nation, in that order. Independent Senator Nick Xenophon also campaigned for Brock.

Results

The by-election was closely contested, with the result being uncertain for over a week. Initial reports suggested a slight swing to the Liberals on the two-party preferred count against Labor, but with Independent candidate Geoff Brock not far behind Labor. By 21 January 2009, both the ABC's Antony Green and the State Electoral Office were indicating a two percent swing against the Liberals toward Labor, but not enough to lose the seat. Liberal leader Martin Hamilton-Smith claimed victory on behalf of the party.

The result hinged on the performance of Brock against Labor in the competition for second place. Brock polled best in the Port Pirie area, and received enough eliminated candidate preferences to end up ahead of the Labor candidate by 30 votes.

Brock received 80 percent of Labor's fifth count preferences to achieve a two-candidate preferred vote of 51.72 percent (a majority of 665 votes) against the Liberals, despite a slight improvement in the Liberal primary vote since the previous count. This was announced by the Electoral Commissioner, Kay Mousley, at 8:30 pm local time on 24 January 2009, but without a formal declaration. The commissioner rejected a request for a recount by Boylan, with a formal request being lodged by the Liberals, which was also rejected, after which the Liberals ruled out a possibility of taking the result to the Court of Disputed Returns. A formal declaration of the by-election outcome was made by the State Electoral Office on 29 January. The by-election saw a rare two-party swing to an incumbent government, and was the first time an opposition had lost a seat at a by-election in South Australia. The result in Frome at the 2010 state election saw Brock increase his primary vote by 14.1 percent to a total of 37.7 percent and his two-candidate vote by 6.5 percent to a total of 58.2 percent. Despite a statewide swing against Labor at the election, Labor again increased its two-party vote in Frome by 1.8 percent to a total of 50.1 percent, coincidentally by 30 votes.

See also
List of South Australian House of Assembly by-elections

External links
An Example of Non-Monotonicity and Opportunities for Tactical Voting at an Australian Election: Antony Green ABC
2009 Frome by-election: ECSA
2009 Frome by-election: Antony Green ABC
William Bowe's "The Poll Bludger" 2009 Frome by-election pre-election discussion
William Bowe's "The Poll Bludger" 2009 Frome by-election post-election discussion

References

2009 elections in Australia
South Australian state by-elections
2000s in South Australia